Zinaida Lindén (born 29 December 1963) is a Russian-born Finnish prose writer, publicist, author of short stories and several novels. She writes in Swedish and Russian. She was a laureate of the Runeberg Prize (2005).

Biography
Lindén was born as Zinaida Vladimirovna Ushakova on 29 December 1963 in Leningrad. In 1986 she graduated from the Philological Faculty of Leningrad University, where she received a diploma in Swedish Language and Literature. She worked as a guide, translator, studied the works of Andrei Tarkovsky and Ingmar Bergman at the Leningrad Institute of Theater, Music and Cinema.

In 1990 Lindén married a Finnish citizen, a physicist; in 1991 she moved to Finland. From 1991 to 1995 she lived in the capital region, and since 1995 she has been living with her family in Turku. She spends a lot of time in St. Petersburg. She has close ties with Japan, where she lived from 1999 to 2000, and which she has visited several times afterwards.

Lindén has two children.

Bibliography
 1996 –  (Söderströms)
 2000 –  (Söderströms)
 2004 –  (Söderströms, Atlantis)
 2007 –  (Söderströms)
 2009 –  (Söderströms )
 2013 –  (Schildts & Söderströms)
 2016 – Valenciana (Schildts & Söderströms )
 2022 – Till min syster bortom haven (Scriptum )

References

1963 births
Living people
Writers from Saint Petersburg
Soviet emigrants to Finland
Finnish people of Russian descent
Finnish women short story writers
Finnish short story writers
Finnish women novelists
Finnish writers in Swedish
20th-century Finnish novelists
21st-century Finnish novelists
21st-century Finnish women writers
20th-century Finnish women writers